52nd NSFC Awards
January 6, 2018

Best Film:
 Lady Bird 

The 52nd National Society of Film Critics Awards, given on 6 January 2018, honored the best in film for 2017.

Winners
Winners are listed in boldface along with the runner-up positions and counts from the final round:

Best Picture
 Lady Bird (41)
 Get Out (39)
 Phantom Thread (28)

Best Director
 Greta Gerwig – Lady Bird (37)
 Jordan Peele – Get Out / Paul Thomas Anderson – Phantom Thread (36)

Best Actor
 Daniel Kaluuya – Get Out (44)
 Daniel Day-Lewis – Phantom Thread (34)
 Timothée Chalamet – Call Me by Your Name (24)

Best Actress
 Sally Hawkins – The Shape of Water and Maudie (49)
 Saoirse Ronan – Lady Bird (44)
 Frances McDormand – Three Billboards Outside Ebbing, Missouri / Cynthia Nixon – A Quiet Passion (24)

Best Supporting Actor
 Willem Dafoe – The Florida Project (62)
 Michael Stuhlbarg – Call Me by Your Name, The Shape of Water, and The Post (25)
 Sam Rockwell – Three Billboards Outside Ebbing, Missouri (23)

Best Supporting Actress
 Laurie Metcalf – Lady Bird (74)
 Lesley Manville – Phantom Thread (36)
 Allison Janney – I, Tonya (24)

Best Screenplay
 Greta Gerwig – Lady Bird (50)
 Jordan Peele – Get Out (49)
 Paul Thomas Anderson – Phantom Thread (31)

Best Cinematography
 Roger Deakins – Blade Runner 2049 (40)
 Hoyte van Hoytema – Dunkirk (39)
 Alexis Zabé – The Florida Project (36)

Best Foreign Language Film
 Graduation – Cristian Mungiu (35)
 Faces Places – Agnès Varda (30)
 BPM (Beats per Minute) – Robin Campillo (29)

Best Non-Fiction Film
 Faces Places – Agnès Varda (70)
 Ex Libris: The New York Public Library – Frederick Wiseman (34)
 Dawson City: Frozen Time – Bill Morrison (32)

Film Heritage Award
 One Way or Another: Black Women's Cinema, 1970–1991, curated by the Brooklyn Academy of Music Cinématek.
 Special commendation to Dan Talbot for his pioneering work as an exhibitor and distributor, in bringing worldwide cinema to the United States.

Special Citation
 Agnieszka Holland's Spoor, a film awaiting American distribution

Dedication
This year's National Society of Film Critics awards are dedicated to Richard Schickel, the legendary film critic and historian, author of 37 books and director of 37 documentaries, and a founding member of the Society, who died on February 18, 2017.

References

External links
 Official website

2017 film awards
2017 in American cinema